Pointe-aux-Trembles station was a railroad station in Montreal, Quebec, Canada. It was located on the corner of Prince-Albert Street and 64th Avenue in the Rivière-des-Prairies–Pointe-aux-Trembles borough.

The station has a disused station building and was an optional stop for two Via Rail routes from Montreal until January 3, 2013. Passengers were directed to use Montreal Central Station, Ahuntsic, or Le Gardeur stations. The Mascouche commuter train line is served by the Pointe-aux-Trembles station nearby.

.

External links

Via Rail stations in Quebec
Railway stations in Montreal
Rivière-des-Prairies–Pointe-aux-Trembles